The Little One Tour is a 2011 concert tour by the American singer-songwriter Bilal, in support of his album Airtight's Revenge. The tour was also used by the singer to promote the charity Autism Speaks and titled after the Airtight's Revenge single "Little One", an ode to his autistic son.

The tour began in February 2011, with shows in the U.S. and Europe, and ended on September 16. On June 18, Bilal headlined along with other acts as part of the Stockholm Jazz Festival and performed two shows in South Africa in August. In addition to Airtight's Revenge, Bilal performed songs from his unreleased second album Love for Sale, which had developed a cult following.

Opening Acts

N'dambi US Leg (select dates)
Rich Medina US Leg (select dates)

Set list

Bilal's set list changes almost every gig, however these are songs he has performed on the tour:
"Free" (Intro)
"Gotsta Be Cool"
"For You"
"Reminsce"
"Love Poems"
"All for Love"
"Something To Hold On To"
"Lord Don't Let It"
"Cake & Eat It Too"
"Think It Over"
"Since I've Been Loving You
"Sometimes"
"Robots"
"The Dollar"
"Levels"
"All Matter"
"Flying"
"Make Me Over"
"Little One"
"Tainted Love"
"White Turns to Grey"
"Soul Sista"

Band

Music Director/Drums: Steve McKie
Bass: Conley "Tone" Whitfield
Keyboards: Corey Bernhard
Guitar: Michael Severson
Background vocals: Chris Turner

Tour dates

References

External links

myspace.combilaloliver
plugresearch/bilal
Bilal tour dates pollstar.com

2011 concert tours